A musical argument is a means of creating tension through the relation of expressive content and musical form:

Experimental musics may use process or indeterminacy rather than argument.

The musical argument may be characterized as the primary flow and current idea being presented in a piece:

Thus one may hear of a musical argument being interrupted, extended, or repeated.

See also
Musical development
Sonata form

Notes

References

Music theory